Senén Mosquera (25 January 1938 – 20 May 2018) was a Colombian footballer. He played in four matches for the Colombia national football team from 1963 to 1973. He was also part of Colombia's squad for the 1963 South American Championship.

References

External links
 

1938 births
2018 deaths
Colombian footballers
Colombia international footballers
Association football goalkeepers
Millonarios F.C. players
People from Buenaventura, Valle del Cauca
Sportspeople from Valle del Cauca Department